Midway is an unincorporated community in Cocke County, Tennessee, United States.

References

Unincorporated communities in Cocke County, Tennessee
Unincorporated communities in Tennessee